Melchor Casco de Mendoza (1581–1658) was a Spanish nobleman, alcalde and alferez real of Buenos Aires. He also served as regidor of Asuncion in 1620.

Biography 

Melchor was born in Asuncion, the son of Víctor Casco de Mendoza and Lucía Valderrama, daughter of Juan de Fustes. He was married to Catalina Astor, daughter of Pedro de Izarra Astor and Úrsula Gómez y Luyz.
 
Melchor Casco de Mendoza was grandson of Gonzalo Casco and María Mendoza, daughter of Gonzalo de Mendoza and Isabel Irala (daughter of Domingo Martínez de Irala).

References 

1581 births
1658 deaths
Spanish colonial governors and administrators
Mayors of Buenos Aires
People from Buenos Aires